A Pagan Storm is the second full-length album by the German Viking / pagan metal band Wolfchant. It was released on April 6, 2007 through CCP Records.

Track listing

 "Growing Storms" – 1:55	
 "A Pagan Storm" – 4:55	
 "The Path" – 3:59	
 "Midnight Gathering" – 3:31	
 "A Wolfchant From the Mountain Side" – 5:06	
 "Guardians of the Forest" – 3:28	
 "Winter Hymn" – 6:50	
 "Stärkend Trunk Aus Feindes Schädel" – 5:44	
 "Voran" – 5:27	
 "Feuerbringer (Loki's Zankrede)" – 4:31	
 "The Axe, the Sword, the Wind and a Wolf" – 5:12

Credits
Lokhi – vocals
Nattulv – bass
Skaahl – guitar
Derrmorh – guitar
Norgahd – drums, keyboard, vocals

2007 albums
Wolfchant albums